Baganwala is a village in the Bhiwani district of the Indian state of Haryana. Part of the Tosham tehsil and legislative assembly constituency, the village had 690 households with a total population of 3,543 of which 1,914 were male and 1,629 female.

References

Villages in Bhiwani district